Ephraim Cohen-Reiss (born 1863 in Jerusalem, died 1943 in France) was one of the pioneers of the Israeli education system. At the turn of the 20th century, he established the first Hebrew school system in Palestine and the Levant.

Biography
Ephraim Cohen-Reiss was born in Jerusalem. When he was 15, he was sent to school in Europe. From  1878–1887 he studied  in Germany (Bildungs-Anstalt für jüdische Lehrer, Hanover) and England. When he returned to Palestine, he was commissioned to restructure the school system. Cohen-Reiss' vision was to create a more advanced curriculum with science and arts all taught in Hebrew. Cohen-Reiss worked with his friend Eliezer Ben Yehuda, the founder of modern Hebrew, to incorporate new Hebrew words into the system. Over the next 25 years, 27 schools had been founded under his plan (including Israel's first co-ed program), and by 1912 the language of Palestine was Hebrew.

Commemoration and legacy
The Cohen-Reiss Prize at King David High School in Vancouver was named after him.

References

1863 births
1943 deaths
Israeli educators